Crystal Palace Ward is an electoral ward in the London Borough of Bromley, covering part of the Crystal Palace area and the entirety of Crystal Palace Park.  It has an estimated population of 12,432 and is represented on the council by two councillors - Angela Wilkins and Richard Williams - both of whom are affiliated to the Labour Party.

The ward was created for the 2002 local elections from parts of the former wards of Anerley, Lawrie Park & Kent House, and Penge.

Elections and representation
The ward is represented by two councillors to the London Borough of Bromley, which were both Liberal Democrats (Tom Papworth and John Canvin) as of August 2013.  Bromley is currently held under majority Conservative control and the Crystal Palace ward returned half of the 4 Liberal Democrats elected to the Council in 2010.

2014 Results

Council elections were held on 22 May 2014, at the same time as the European Parliament election.  The list of candidates was published on 14 May 2014 - for the first time, UKIP put forward a council candidate in the ward.  Tom Papworth's wife Vicki was standing as a Liberal Democrat candidate as the previous councillor - John Canvin - was not standing for re-election in 2014.

The Liberal Democrats lost both seats in the ward to the Labour Party.  The results were:

There were 12 spoiled ballots (6 for voting for more candidates than the voter was entitled to and 6 being unmarked or wholly void).
Of an electorate of 8351, 3095 ballots were issued.

The results grouped by party were:

2010 Results
 
One of the Conservative candidates, Karen Moran, previously stood as a candidate in the ward for the Green Party in 2007, 2006 and 2002.

The last ward election was held alongside the United Kingdom General Election of 2010, with the following results:

The results grouped by party were:

2007 Results
A by-election for one seat was held on 6 September 2007 after the death of the previous office-holder, Chris Gaster:

Population
Based on the results of the 2011 Census, the Office for National Statistics estimated that the population of the ward was 12,432, comprising 6,099 males and 6,333 females.

References

External links
MapIt - Crystal Palace ward boundary

Wards of the London Borough of Bromley
Crystal Palace, London